is a Japanese manga series written and illustrated by Fumi Yoshinaga. It was serialized in Hakusensha's manga magazine Melody from June 2004 to December 2020, with its chapters collected in 19 tankōbon volumes. The manga is licensed in North America by Viz Media. Ōoku: The Inner Chambers follows an alternate history of early modern Japan in which an unknown disease kills most of the male population, leading to a matriarchal society in which the Ōoku becomes a harem of men serving the now female Shogun.

It was adapted into two live-action films in 2010 and 2012 and a 10-episode Japanese television drama series in 2012. Another television drama series premiered in January 2023

As of December 2020, the manga had over 6 million copies in circulation. Ōoku: The Inner Chambers won an Excellence Prize at the 10th Japan Media Arts Festival, a special prize at The Japanese Association of Feminist Science Fiction and Fantasy's fifth annual Sense of Gender Awards in 2005, and the Grand Prize of the 13th Tezuka Osamu Cultural Prize in 2009.

Outline
The world of Ōoku: The Inner Chambers is modeled on the Edo period in Japan, and centers on the Ōoku of Edo Castle, where the basis of social management and power is shifted from men to women as a result of the rapid decline in the male population caused by a mysterious plague.

In this work, figures who are male in history, such as the Shoguns of the Tokugawa clan for generations and those who held important positions, are replaced by women, and figures who are female by men. The story is composed of detailed descriptions based on historical facts interwoven with fiction. As for descriptions based on historical facts such as a report by an Opperhoofd: "I had an audience with Iemitsu through a blind, and I thought his voice sounded like a boy's. In the audience, only young men were seated with him. I saw many women working in the city." The rough outline in the frontispiece and columns in the magazine "Melody" reads, "Gender reversal! Parallel historical drama" or "This is a story that approximates but is not identical to the Edo period in Japan," etc., and is positioned as a so-called science fiction work (historical alteration science fiction).

Story
During the rule of Tokugawa Iemitsu, the third Shogun of the Tokugawa shogunate, a boy was attacked by a bear in a rural village in the Kantō region, which triggered the spread of a strange disease later known as the "redface pox." No cure or treatment was ever discovered for the disease, except that it "only affects young boys" and has an "80% fatality rate." As a result, the male population plummeted to about one-quarter of the female population, and the social structure of Japan was drastically changed. Boys were raised as scarce stallions and were forced to either go to grooms, be rented out to poor families who could not get grooms at any price per night, or sell their bodies in the brothels. On the other hand, women replaced men as the main labor force, and all family businesses were handed down from woman to woman. In Edo Castle, too, the shogunship was handed over to women after the third Shogun, Iemitsu, and the Ōoku attracted endangered young men as proof of the Shogun's prestige, creating a world of men commonly referred to as "three thousand beautiful men."

Yoshimune
It was during the rule of the eighth Shogun, Yoshimune. She appointed her entourage  as her , and carried out various reforms of the shogunate administration. Her decisive reforms also extended to the Ōoku, where three thousand beautiful men were ridiculed as the wasteful spenders of the shogunate.
One day, Yoshimune wondered why women had both female and male names. In official documents, all women were listed under male names, and even if they had husbands, they were either not mentioned, or they were purposely listed as wives under female names. She believed that this made it impossible to obtain accurate statistics for the country and had a negative impact on the shogunate administration.
He told her that they were named the Chronicle of the Dying Day. She suggested that the book's name could have been a little more flamboyant, but he replied that it was the Honourable Kasuga who ordered the name to be used. She asked him what kind of man Kasuga, the founder of this Ōoku, was. Masasuke replied that Lady Kasuga was a woman. Yoshimune was shocked by his words. She then began to open the pages of the logbooks, thinking that if she read them, she would find the answer to why all the official records used male names, even though it was women who were actually running the country.

Iemitsu
It dates back to the rule of the third Shogun, Iemitsu. The redface pox was spreading throughout Japan. Arikoto, a handsome monk of noble birth who had come to Edo Castle from Kyoto, was forcibly returned to secular life along with a boy monk, Gyokuei, under threat from Lady Kasuga, and was admitted to the Ōoku to become Iemitsu's . However, it was revealed that the original Iemitsu had already died of the redface pox, and that Arikoto's entry to the Ōoku was so that Chie, Iemitsu's illegitimate daughter, could give birth to an heir. The truth is that for the sake of the continuation of the Tokugawa clan, the Ōoku have been rewritten by Lady Kasuga to be a male-dominated world.

As Arikoto interacted with Chie, he learned of her many painful pasts in which she had been taken in the place of the Shogun and stripped of her life as a woman. Arikoto affirmed Chie's existence as a woman, and Chie also fell in love with him. Filled with affection, Chie began to show her original intelligence and talent for politics.

After the death of Lady Kasuga, Chie announced the death of the original Iemitsu to all the Feudal Lords in Japan and declared that she would assume the title of Iemitsu herself and rule the country as a female Shogun. The Lords, who had been suffering from a decline in the number of male heirs, followed suit, and it became the basic rule that women would inherit the governorship.

Chie, who was unable to have any children with Arikoto, died at the age of 27 after having three children with her Concubines, including Gyokuei.

Ietsuna
Chie's eldest daughter, Chiyo, became the fourth Shogun, Ietsuna, at the age of 11. She was nicknamed "Lady Do So" because of her lack of interest in politics and her "You may do so" attitude toward the advice of shogunate officials. However, with the help of Arikoto and other outstanding vassals from her mother's time, her shogunate maintained stability.

On the night of the Great fire of Meireki in Edo, Ietsuna is alone with Arikoto while evacuating the castle, and suddenly confesses her love for him. Ietsuna died without an heir, and the fifth Shogun was Tsunayoshi, the daughter of Chie and Keishō-in.

Tsunayoshi
Tsunayoshi became the fifth Shogun, and together with her , Yanagisawa Yoshiyasu, she demonstrated political skills that were a complete change from those of her predecessor, while at the same time using her lovely and bewitching appearance to lead a wild sex life.

This led to an intensified power struggle for Tsunayoshi's favor between her father Keishō-in, Emonnosuke, and the Concubines who represented each of them. Tsunayoshi, who was unable to rule well and produce an heir, wondered why she was still alive, but Emonnosuke told her that the relationship between a woman and a man was not limited to procreation. Tsunayoshi, who was united with Emonnosuke, broke the curse of her father and nominated Ienobu, the daughter of Tsunashige, whom her father disliked, as the next Shogun, but Emonnosuke died suddenly soon after.

Later, her father, Keishō-in, passed away, and Tsunayoshi contracted measles and became critically ill. Her Chief Retainer, Yoshiyasu, visited Tsunayoshi on her sickbed and suffocated her to death while confessing her secret feelings for Tsunayoshi. Her death was officially ruled as death by measles, and Yoshiyasu left Edo Castle as Ienobu assumed the shogunate.

Ienobu
The story takes place a little further back in time, during the rule of Tsunayoshi. Katsuta Sakyō, who was living a life of idleness in Edo, was picked up after being injured in a betting dispute by Manabe Akifusa, Ienobu's Chief Retainer. Sakyō eventually fell in love with Akifusa, but her intention was to make him Ienobu's Concubine. Sakyō met Ienobu and was impressed by her personality, and they had a child together, Chiyo, who would later become her successor.

Ienobu, who became the sixth Shogun, struggled to correct Tsunayoshi's maladministration and was expected by the common people to be a stateswoman, but due to frailty, she died three years after assuming the shogunate. At this time, Sakyō had a half-hearted one-night stand with Akifusa, who was disturbed by her proprietress's death, which became the prelude to the Ejima-Ikushima affair.

Ietsugu
Ienobu and Gekkō-in's daughter, Chiyo, became the seventh Shogun, Ietsugu. Ietsugu, only four years old, was so sickly that she was in danger of failing to reach adulthood, and there was a conflict in the Ōoku between Ten'ei-in of Yoshimune in the Kishū Domain faction and Akifusa and Gekkō-in of Tsugutomo in the Owari Domain faction over who should be the next Shogun. At that time, Ejima, the General Director of the Ōoku, who was on Gekkō-in's side, was captured as a result of the Ejima-Ikushima affair. It was a plot by Yoshimune's faction to force him to testify against Gekkō-in and Akifusa for their infidelity, but Ejima denied everything and was sentenced to death. Gekkō-in asked Ten'ei-in to spare Ejima's life and maintain the treatment of Akifusa after the change of Shogun in exchange for Yoshimune's nomination as the next Shogun, which Ten'ei-in accepted.

As a result, Yoshimune was chosen as the eighth Shogun. Ietsugu then died of illness at the age of seven.

Ieshige
Yoshimune, who had learned about the history of the Ōoku and Japan up to this point from reading the unofficial record, the Chronicle of the Dying Day, feared that she would be invaded by foreign nations with few men in Japan, and began efforts to eradicate the redface pox. At the same time, Yoshimune also made groundbreaking political reforms and was soon blessed with three daughters, and her rule seemed secure. However, Ieshige, the eldest daughter, had language disorder, while Munetake, the second daughter, was good-looking and intelligent, so much so that people suggested that Ieshige be disinherited and Munetake become the heir. Yoshimune, who knew that Ieshige's intelligence was normal and that she suffered from physical disabilities, declared that Ieshige would be the next Shogun, but Ieshige's character was distorted by the prejudice and ridicule she was subjected to, and she spent her days indulging in drinking and lust. On the other hand, Ieshige's Chief Retainer, Tanuma Okitsugu, was recognized by Yoshimune for her insightful talents and began to play an active role on the political stage.

After Yoshimune's death, Okitsugu followed Yoshimune's wishes and embarked on measures to combat the redface pox. She invited Aonuma, a mixed blood who had studied  in Nagasaki, to give lectures on Dutch studies to the men in the Ōoku, and gathered information from Hiraga Gennai, who traveled around the country. In the process, Aonuma came to the conclusion that preventive measures, rather than curative measures, should be taken against the redface pox.

Ieharu
Ieshige handed over her shogunship to her eldest daughter, Ieharu, and retired to the Nishinomaru Palace in Edo Castle. Ieharu appointed Okitsugu as an Elder and entrusted her with the overall management of the shogunate and the redface pox. Okitsugu's skills earned her great support from the Ōoku and the shogunate officials, but her promotion of Dutch studies and mercantilism led some of her subjects and the common people of Edo to become displeased with her.

Meanwhile, Aonuma and Kuroki, who had learned Dutch studies from Aonuma, searched for a method of preventing the redface pox, and arrived at the variolation method based on information obtained from Western books. Gennai found a patient with attenuated pox, and the method was successful, but among those inoculated, Matsudaira Sadanobu's nephew died from the side effect. In addition, Okitsugu lost her power due to a series of natural disasters, including the Tenmei eruption and the Great Tenmei famine, the death of Ieharu's successor , and the assassination of Ietsugu's daughter, which led to her downfall at the same time as Ieharu's death. Aonuma was condemned to death, and Kuroki, who had studied Dutch studies, and others were banished from the Ōoku. Gennai contracted syphilis as a result of Harunari's plot and died, and Kuroki, who was left behind, expressed his anger at the unreasonableness of the situation.

Harunari was expected to become the 11th Shogun, but she announced that her son Ienari would become Shogun. Harunari persuaded the shogunate officials that Ienari had been vaccinated by Aonuma and others, and that there was no need to worry about the possibility of redface pox. This resulted in the birth of Ienari, the first male Shogun since Iemitsu.

Ienari
Although Ienari was inaugurated as a male Shogun, he was not allowed to meddle in politics, and the real power was in the hands of his mother, Harunari. She forced Ienari to have children, while she assassinated them out of boredom. Ienari contacted Kuroki behind Harunari's back, and had them resume their research on redface pox in secret. Eventually, Kuroki and his team arrived at a vaccination using attenuated redface pox bear as the seed, and succeeded in preventing the plague without any side effects. However, the fame of the vaccine reached Edo Castle, and it was revealed to Harunari that Ienari had been secretly helping his research on the redface pox.

Harunari tries to poison Ienari, but at that moment, it is Harunari who falls ill from the poison. In fact, Ienari's Official Wife  and his Concubine  realized that it was Ienari who had poisoned their children, and over the years they had been planning to assassinate Harunari while deceiving even their husband Ienari. Shiga, who had herself been poisoning Harunari for many years, died on the spot, and Harunari, although she survived, was unable to speak or move.

Ienari then exercised his true power as the Shogun and half-assedly promoted the spread of vaccination against the redface pox. As a result, the male population recovered rapidly and the Kasei culture reached its zenith. Ienari handed over his shogunship to his son Ieyoshi, but continued to hold political power as the Shogun Emeritus, and a few years later, Ienari reconciled with Shige, with whom he had been estranged since the attempted poisoning of Harunari, and passed away.

Ieyoshi
While the restoration of the male population has led to a resurgence of inheritance by male samurai, the Abe family, which has served the Tokugawa family for many years, had a female head of the family, Abe Masahiro. Masahiro, who had achieved much success as a Magistrate of Temples and Shrines, was promoted by a shogunate official to the position of Elder at a young age, despite the fact that the number of women in the shogunate was declining.

In 1853, the year of the Perry Expedition, the 13th Shogun was inaugurated by Iesada, daughter of Ieyoshi.

Iesada
Iesada had been sexually abused by his father, Ieyoshi, since she was a child. Masahiro, who came to Edo Castle as an Elder, sensed this and, with the help of Kōdai-in (formerly Shige), succeeded in enclosing Iesada in the inner part of Nishinomaru to protect her from Ieyoshi. Takiyama was appointed as the General Director in charge of the inner part of Nishinomaru. On the other hand, Ieyoshi's obsession with Iesada remained unabated, and two of Iesada's Official Husbands were assassinated in succession.

Masahiro solicited the opinions of samurai, townspeople, and farmers alike, and the establishment of the Nagasaki Naval Training Center and the conclusion of the Convention of Kanagawa marked the end of the isolationist regime that had existed for 200 years.

Then, Iesada married Shimazu Taneatsu again. Iesada found out that Taneatsu was on a mission to install Yoshinobu of the Hitotsubashi family as the next Shogun by a trick of the Satsuma Domain. However, Iesada's personality touched Taneatsu, and he devoted himself to Iesada wholeheartedly, and Iesada also opened her heart to Taneatsu. Iesada eventually became pregnant with Taneatsu's child, but died before the last month of pregnancy. In accordance with Iesada's will, Taneatsu changed his name to Tenshō-in without being ordained, and adopted Fukuko from the Kishū Tokugawa family to become the next Shogun.

Iemochi
Soon after Fukuko changed her name to Iemochi and became Shogun, the Ansei Purge occurred. As part of the Union of the Imperial Court and the Shogunate, a wedding was to take place between Emperor Kōmei's brother, Prince Kazu and Iemochi, but when he arrived, he was a woman dressed as a man. She revealed that she was Chikako, the sister of the real Prince Kazu, and that she had taken the place of her brother who did not want to go to the wedding. This was an act of her desire to win the affection of her mother, who was always fond of her brother, but Iemochi stood by her, and Chikako opened her heart to Iemochi.

Various interests, including those of Satsuma Domain, Chōshū Domain, and the Imperial court, became entangled, and the survival of the Tokugawa shogunate was in jeopardy.

Then, Iemochi fell ill with thiamine deficiency. Concerned about the future of her country, the Tokugawa shogunate and Chikako, Iemochi, despite her illness, went to Kyoto to see Emperor Kōmei, but she died in the capital. Iemochi's will that her adopted son Kamenosuke should be the next Shogun was crushed, and Yoshinobu became the last Shogun of the shogunate.

The end of the Ōoku
Although the war between the shogunate and the Chōshū Domain was averted on the pretext of Iemochi's death, the end of the shogunate government was no longer inevitable with the return of power to the Imperial court. Katsu Kaishū, who had been given full authority over the shogunate forces by Yoshinobu, went to talk with Saigō Takamori, the commander of the new government forces, in order to prevent a general attack on Edo. Takamori pressed Kaishū to hand over Yoshinobu or fight back in Edo. Takamori argued that Yoshinobu's death was necessary to bring to naught the shameful history of the Tokugawa, who had ruled the country by women. Hearing this, Chikako was furious and intervened, revealing that she herself was a woman, and demanded that the general attack be called off, citing the case of Prince Kazu's substitution and the involvement of Iwakura Tomomi on the side of the new government in the poisoning of Emperor Kōmei. As a result, Takamori agreed to state that all Shoguns of the Tokugawa family for generations were men, and the bloodless fall of Edo Castle was accomplished. Instead of the entire history of the Tokugawa women being buried in darkness, the city of Edo and its people, whom they had protected and loved, were preserved.

In 1871. Tenshō-in, a Satsuma man on a Western voyage as Shimazu Taneatsu, told a little girl, Tsuda Umeko, who is going to study on the same ship: "Even a woman can become a person to run a country. In fact, this country was once ruled by women for generations."

Media

Manga
Ōoku: The Inner Chambers is written and illustrated by Fumi Yoshinaga. It was serialized in Hakusensha's Melody from June 28, 2004 to December 28, 2020. Hakusensha collected its chapters in nineteen tankōbon volumes released from October 4, 2005, to February 26, 2021.

In North America, the manga is licensed by Viz Media. The manga is also licensed in French by Kana and in Taiwan by Sharp Point Press.

Volume list

Live-action film
 directed a live-action adaptation of the manga entitled Ooku Danjo Gyakuten (one English translation of the title being Lady Shogun and her Men), specifically covering the Yoshimune and Mizuno arc of the story. Filming began in the spring of 2010, and the film opened on October 1, 2010. Kazunari Ninomiya played the role of Yuunoshin Mizuno, a new addition to the Shoguns harem, and Kou Shibasaki played Shogun Yoshimune.

Live-action series
A ten episode drama,  aired on TBS between October 12, 2012 and December 14, 2012, starring Masato Sakai and Mikako Tabe. It achieved an audience share of between 7.0% and 11.6% during its first airing. Masato Sakai won a prize in the Galaxy Award for his part in this drama and another work of his.

Another television drama series was announced in August 2022 and premiered on January 10, 2023 in NHK's "" slot, starring Sota Fukushi, Mayu Hotta, and Yuki Saito. Lilas Ikuta performed the series' theme song .

Reception

Manga
Ōoku: The Inner Chambers was nominated for the first annual Manga Taishō in 2008. It was nominated for the Tezuka Osamu Cultural Prize three years in a row from 2007 to 2009 before it won the Grand Prize in April 2009. Previously, the manga also won an Excellence Prize in the 10th Japan Media Arts Festival in 2006. It won a special prize in The Japanese Association of Feminist Science Fiction and Fantasy's 5th and 21st annual Sense of Gender Awards in 2005 and 2022, respectively.

The manga won the 2009 James Tiptree Jr. Award, which is awarded to science fiction works which expand or explore one's understanding of gender. In January 2011, the manga won the 56th Shogakukan Manga Award in the shōjo category. The series was awarded the Grand Prize of the 42nd Nihon SF Taisho Award in 2021. Ōoku: The Inner Chambers was nominated for the 53rd Seiun Award in the Best Comic category in 2022. In January 2010, The American Library Association's Young Adult Library Services Association (YALSA) division listed Ōoku: The Inner Chambers in the 2010 Top Ten Great Graphic Novels for Teens list.

Sales
As of December 2020, the manga had over 6 million copies in circulation. The fourth volume of Ōoku: The Inner Chambers was ranked 5th on the Tohan charts between December 23, 2008 and January 5, 2009 and ranked 24th on the Tohan charts between January 6 and 12, 2009. The seventh volume of the manga sold around 167,000 copies in its debut week and reached No. 1 on the Japan's Oricon weekly comic ranking for the first time in July 2011.

Critical reception
In a review of the first volume, Casey Brienza of Anime News Network stated that "the manga is the perfect marriage of stylistic shortcomings to appropriate subject matter—the beautiful costumes are important players and plot points throughout the story, and the lack of character expression matches a world of intensely ritualized social interaction perfectly. Furthermore, while Yoshinaga isn't know[n] for her gorgeously rendered settings, artistic assistants provide much needed background detail and atmosphere."

Holly Ellingwood describes the manga as a "fascinating study of 'what if'", and praises Viz's presentation of the manga. Katherine Dacey criticised the English translation of the manga, finding it awkwardly juxtaposed faux-old-English with modern language, and enjoyed the characterisation of Yoshimune.  She found the second volume more engaging than the first. Carlo Santos of Anime News Network enjoyed the artwork which shows the period detail in the second volume. Leroy Douresseaux wrote that by the sixth volume, the focus of the series was much more on character drama and the political climate than on gender roles.

References

External links
 
 
 

2004 manga
2012 Japanese television series debuts
2012 Japanese television series endings
Fumi Yoshinaga
Historical fantasy anime and manga
Hakusensha manga
Hakusensha franchises
James Tiptree Jr. Award-winning works
Japanese television dramas based on manga
Josei manga
Kin'yō Dorama
Live-action films based on manga
Manga adapted into films
Romance anime and manga
Sharp Point Press titles
Viz Media manga
Winner of Tezuka Osamu Cultural Prize (Grand Prize)
Winners of the Shogakukan Manga Award for shōjo manga
Gender in speculative fiction
Alternate history manga
Japanese romance films